Melvin Lynn Bunch, Jr. (born November 4, 1971), is a former Major League Baseball pitcher. He also played three seasons in Japan for the Chunichi Dragons from  through .

In his second start with Chunichi in April 2000, Bunch became the fourth American to throw a no-hitter in Nippon Professional Baseball. Bunch left the Dragons and returned to the United States in August 2002 to seek treatment for anxiety attacks. He would not play in professional baseball again.

References

External links

1971 births
Living people
Baseball players from Texas
Major League Baseball pitchers
Kansas City Royals players
Seattle Mariners players
Texarkana Bulldogs baseball players
American expatriate baseball players in Japan
Gulf Coast Royals players
Chunichi Dragons players
Omaha Royals players
Tacoma Rainiers players
People from Texarkana, Texas
Eugene Emeralds players
Rockford Royals players
Ottawa Lynx players
American expatriate baseball players in Canada
Harrisburg Senators players
Wilmington Blue Rocks players